David P. Casey (1842 – January 4, 1893) was an Irish soldier who fought in the American Civil War. Casey received the United States' highest award for bravery during combat, the Medal of Honor, for his action during the Battle of Cold Harbor in Virginia on 3 June 1864. He was honored with the award on 14 September 1888.

Biography
Casey was born in Ireland in 1842. He joined the Army from Northbridge, Massachusetts in October 1861, and mustered out with his regiment in July 1865. Casey died on 4 January 1893 and his remains are interred at the Saint Patrick's Cemetery in Northbridge, Massachusetts.

Medal of Honor citation

See also

List of American Civil War Medal of Honor recipients: A–F

References

1842 births
1893 deaths
Irish-born Medal of Honor recipients
People of Massachusetts in the American Civil War
Union Army officers
United States Army Medal of Honor recipients
American Civil War recipients of the Medal of Honor